An Armalite rifle (AR) is one of a series of rifles the ArmaLite company made or, more generally, a rifle based on one of its designs, such as the ArmaLite AR-15 rifle. Eugene Stoner, Jacques Michault, Melvin Johnson, Robert Fremont, and Jim Sullivan are some of the designers credited with their development. In the United States, these rifles are generally known by their model numbers. The AR before the model number stands for "ArmaLite Rifle".

References

ArmaLite
Assault rifles